Alia (Sicilian: Àlia)  is a comune in the Metropolitan City of Palermo, on the Italian island of Sicily. It is known for the Grotte Della Gurfa, or Gurfa Caves Urban Reserve.

References 

Municipalities of the Metropolitan City of Palermo